Geisinger may refer to:

Organizations
Geisinger Commonwealth School of Medicine, a private medical school in Pennsylvania
Geisinger Health System, Pennsylvania based healthcare system

Places
Geisinger Holy Spirit, a hospital in Camp Hill, Pennsylvania
Geisinger Medical Center, a hospital in Danville, Pennsylvania

People
Geisinger is a surname. Notable people with the surname include:

Alex Geisinger (born 1992), American disc golfer
David Geisinger (1790–1860), United States Navy officer
Harry Geisinger (1933–2015), American politician
Joseph Geisinger, American sound engineer
Justin Geisinger (born 1982), American football player